The Glass site (22 WR 502) is a Plaquemine culture archaeological site located approximately  south of Vicksburg in Warren County, Mississippi. Originally the site had four platform mounds surrounding a large open plaza, but land leveling for modern farming techniques and looting by pothunters mean only portions of three have survived into the 21st century. It was a major ceremonial center that was contemporaneous with other large Plaquemine sites including Emerald, Holly Bluff, and Winterville and whose main occupation period occurred during the protohistoric period from 1500 to 1650 CE. Parts of the site were excavated by Clarence Bloomfield Moore in 1910 and 1911, and by Lauren Elizabeth Downs in 2007-2009. The mounds are listed on the Mississippi Mound Trail.

Site chronology
The Glass site sits on the northern edge of the area covered by the Natchez Bluff phase, immediately south of the Yazoo Basin phase area and across the Mississippi River from the Tensas Basin area. While it was lightly occupied during the earlier Marksville and Coles Creek eras; its main period of occupation was during the protohistoric Emerald phase from 1500 to 1650 CE. This era saw its florescence as a major civic center and the construction of the platform mounds. It was inhabited during the time of the de Soto entrada down the Mississippi in 1543 and is considered a possible candidate for the polity of "Quigualtam" or the unnamed group encountered by the expedition below Quigualtam; both of whom fiercely attacked the Spaniards as they drifted down the river. It was no longer in use by the time of sustained European contact when the French arrived in the 1680s.

See also
Culture, phase, and chronological table for the Mississippi Valley

References

External links
 
 

Plaquemine Mississippian culture
Mounds in Mississippi
Geography of Warren County, Mississippi